The Polish People's Party (PSL) is an agrarian political party in Poland. It is currently led by Władysław Kosiniak-Kamysz.

Its history traces back to 1895, when it held the name People's Party, although its name was changed to the present one in 1903. During the Second Polish Republic, the Polish People's Party was represented by a number of parties that held its name. They were all supportive of agrarian policies, although they spanned from the left-wing to the centre-right on the political spectrum. It was reformed into the People's Party shortly after the Sanacja regime took power. It took part into the formation of Polish government-in-exile during the World War II, and after the war it was again reformed into the Polish People's Party, and soon after into the United People's Party. During the existence of Polish People's Republic, it was seen as a satellite party of the ruling Polish United Workers' Party that promoted rural interests. After the fall of communism, it participated in the governments led by Democratic Left Alliance. In the mid-2000s, it began shifting more to the centre-right and it adopted more conservative policies. It entered the government again following the 2007 parliamentary election, and since 2015 it has served in the opposition.

Today, it is positioned in the centre and leans towards the centre-right, and besides holding agrarian and conservative views, it is also Christian-democratic, and supports Poland's membership in the European Union. It currently has 19 seats in the Sejm and 2 seats in the Senate. On national level, it heads the Polish Coalition and on European level, it is a part of the European People's Party.

History

Before 1945
The party's name traces its tradition to an agrarian party in Austro-Hungarian-controlled Galician Poland, which sent MPs to the parliament in Vienna. The party was formed in 1895 in the Polish town of Rzeszow under the name Stronnictwo Ludowe (People's Party). The party changed its name in 1903 to what it's known as now. The party was led by Wincenty Witos and was quite successful, seating representatives in the Galician parliament before the turn of the 19th century. In the Second Polish Republic there were a few parties named PSL (Polish People's Party "Wyzwolenie", Polish People's Party "Piast", Polish People's Party "Left" and others) until they were removed by the Sanacja regime (see also People's Party).

During this time, there were two parties using the term "Polish People's Party", namely Polish People's Party "Piast" and Polish People's Party "Wyzwolenie" (which were merged into People's Party with Stronnictwo Chłopskie). During World War II, PSL took part in forming the Polish government in exile.

Under the communist regime

In June 1945 after the war Stanisław Mikołajczyk, a PSL leader who had been Prime Minister of the Polish government in exile, returned to communist-dominated Poland, where he joined the provisional government and rebuilt PSL. The party hoped to win the Yalta Conference-mandated elections and help establish a parliamentary system in Poland. However, the party soon found itself targeted with intimidation, arrests and violence by the communist secret police.

The communists also formed a rival ersatz 'Peasants' party' controlled by them, in order to confuse voters. The January 1947 parliamentary election was heavily rigged, with the communist-controlled bloc claiming to have won 80 percent of the vote. The PSL were said to have won just 10 percent of the vote, but many neutral observers believe the PSL would have won the election had it been conducted fairly.

Mikołajczyk was soon compelled to flee Poland for his life in October 1947. The communists then forced the remains of Mikołajczyk's PSL to unite with the pro-communist People's Party to form the United People's Party. The ZSL was a governing partner in the ruling coalition.

Post-communist period (1990–2003) 
Around the time of the fall of communism several PSLs were recreated, including Porozumienie Ludowe, Polskie Stronnictwo Ludowe-Odrodzenie, and Polskie Stronnictwo Ludowe (Wilanów faction). In 1989 most merged into one party and took part in forming the first postwar noncommunist government in Poland with the Solidarity grouping, and in 1990 changed its name to PSL.

It remained on the left of Polish politics in the 1990s, entering into coalitions with the postcommunist Democratic Left Alliance. In the 2001 parliamentary elections, PSL received 9% of votes and formed a coalition with the Democratic Left Alliance, an alliance which later broke down. Since then, PSL has moved towards more centrist and conservative policies.

Opposition years (2003–2007) 
The party ran in the 2004 European Parliament election as part of the European People's Party (EPP) and received 6% of the vote, giving it 4 of 54 Polish seats in the European Parliament. In the 2005 general election, the party received 7% of votes, giving it 25 seats in the Sejm and 2 in the Senate. In the 2007 parliamentary elections, the party placed fourth, with 8.93% of the vote and 31 out of 460 seats, and entered into a governing coalition with the victor, the centre-right conservative Civic Platform. In European parliament elections PSL received 7.01% of votes in 2009. In the 2011 national parliamentary election, Polish People's Party received 8.36% votes which gave them 28 seats in the Sejm and 2 mandates in the Senate.

Coalition government (2007–2015) 
After the parliamentary elections in 2007, PSL won 8.91% of the popular vote and 31 seats, it joined the government coalition led by Civic Platform. Waldemar Pawlak was appointed deputy prime minister, Marek Sawicki was appointed as agriculture minister, and Jolanta Fedak was appointed as labor minister. In the 2009 European Parliament election, it won 3 seats. After the Smolensk air disaster, presidential elections were held in which Pawlak placed fifth, winning 1.75% of the vote. In the second round they didn't state their support for anyone.

In the 2010 local government elections, PSL obtained 16.3% of the votes in the elections to voivodship assemblies, in which it received 93 seats. In the Świętokrzyskie sejmik, the party received the most seats. In all parliamentary assemblies, PSL found itself in ruling coalitions with the PO, in four voivodeships receiving the positions of marshals. In the elections to poviat councils, the PSL committee obtained 15.88%, and in the elections to municipal councils 11% of the votes. The PSL won the largest number of village leaders (428) and mayors in the country, and in Zgierz, the party's candidate won the presidential election. In 2011, a PiS senator defected to PSL.

In the parliamentary elections of 2011, PSL obtained 8.36% of votes on the list of candidates for the Sejm. The party also won two seats in the Senate. Eugeniusz Grzeszczak became the deputy speaker of the Sejm on behalf of the PSL. PSL again became a partner of the PO in the government coalition. On December 7, 2011, as a result of the entry into force of the Lisbon Treaty, Arkadiusz Bratkowski, a PSL politician, assumed a mandate in the European Parliament.

In July 2012, Stanisław Kalemba replaced Marek Sawicki as the minister of agriculture and rural development. Pawlak was defeated during the presidential election by Janusz Piechociński. Two days later, Waldemar Pawlak announced his resignation as deputy prime minister and minister of economy. He was dismissed from both functions on November 27. On December 6, both these offices were taken over by Janusz Piechociński.

In January 2014, PSL decided to establish cooperation with SKL and Samoobrona, but SKL already in February announced that Jarosław Gowin joined Poland Together, and the PSL talks about a joint election campaign with Samoobrona did not end with an agreement. In March, MP Andrzej Dąbrowski left PSL. The party's candidate in the 2015 presidential election was the marshal of the Świętokrzyskie Province, party vice president Adam Jarubas. He placed 6th, obtaining 238,761 votes. Before the second round, PSL was involved in the campaign of the then-incumbent President Bronisław Komorowski.

Modern period (2015–present) 
At the 2015 parliamentary election, the PSL dropped to 5.13 percent of the vote, just barely over the 5 percent threshold. With 16 seats, it was the smallest of the five factions in the Sejm.

Since then PSL has lost even more support to PiS during the 2018 Polish local elections when they lost 87 seats and dropped to 12.07% unlike the 23.9% they got at the last local elections. After this, the party became junior partner in coalitions with Civic Coalition and SLD.

In 2019 European election, PSL won 3 seats as a part of the European Coalition.

For parliamentary elections in the same year, PSL decided to create centrist and Christian-democratic coalition named as Polish Coalition. Polish Coalition, apart from PSL, consisted of Kukiz'15, Union of European Democrats and another liberal, catholic and regionalist organisations. This coalition resulted in election of 30 members. Majority of them (20) were members of PSL.

In November 2020, PSL decided to end coalition with Kukiz'15 due to differences on negotiations on EU budget.

Ideology
The Polish People's Party adhered to principles of social democracy and agrarian socialism during the 1990s, although it has moved towards Christian democracy in the 2000s. It was positioned on the left-wing on the political spectrum during that period.

The party's platform is strongly based on agrarianism. On social and ethical issues, PSL is attached to more social conservative values, as it opposes abortion, legalisation of same-sex marriage, euthanasia, death penalty, and soft drug decriminalisation. The party is in favour of maintaining religion lessons in public education. In 2019, the party adopted (as part of an agreement with Kukiz'15) in the party's platform direct democracy's postulates, including introducing single-member districts, electronic voting and obligatory referendums.

Election results

Support
The Party's traditional support base consisted of farmers, peasants and rural voters. Voters are generally more social conservative than voters of Civic Platform. Its main competitor in rural areas is the national conservative Law and Justice (PiS).

In the 2010s the party started to lose support between rural voters (especially in southeast of Poland, e.g. Subcarpathian Voivodeship). In 2019 election PSL gained surprisingly significant support in cities and won mandates (e. g. in Warsaw and Wrocław).

Sejm

Senate

Presidential

Regional assemblies

European Parliament

Leadership
Chairman: 
 Roman Bartoszcze (1990–1991)
 Waldemar Pawlak (1991–1997)
 Jarosław Kalinowski (1997–2004)
 Janusz Wojciechowski (2004–2005)
 Waldemar Pawlak (2005–2012)
 Janusz Piechociński (2012–2015)
 Władysław Kosiniak-Kamysz (2015–present)

Voivodeship Marshals

See also
List of Polish People's Party politicians

Notes

References

External links

 

 
1895 establishments in Austria-Hungary
1895 establishments in Poland
1990 establishments in Poland
Agrarian parties in Poland
Political parties established in 1895
Political parties established in 1990
Political parties in Poland